The Arizona Wildcats football program represents the University of Arizona (UA) in the sport of American college football. Arizona competes in the Football Bowl Subdivision (FBS) of the National Collegiate Athletic Association (NCAA) and the South Division of the Pac-12 Conference (Pac-12). They play their home games at Arizona Stadium, which opened in 1929 on the university's campus in Tucson, Arizona, and has a capacity of 50,782. The team is coached by Jedd Fisch.

Arizona's inaugural season was in 1889. The school joined the Pac-10 Conference in 1978 alongside rival Arizona State, and became a member of the Pac-12 South Division when the conference realigned in 2011.

The Wildcats have won six conference championships (including the 1993 Pac-10 title) and made 21 bowl appearances, one of which are among the New Year's Six Bowls.

History

Early history (1899–1979)

The varsity football program at the University of Arizona began in 1899, though the Wildcats nickname was not adopted until later. Stuart Forbes became the first head coach of Arizona football history and the team compiled a 1–1–1 record. From 1900 to 1901, William W. Skinner served as head football coach at the University of Arizona. While there, he also studied geology. He guided Arizona to 3–1 and 4–1 records, respectively. On November 7, 1914, the team traveled to the west coast to play Occidental, then one of the reigning gridiron powers in California. Occidental won 14–0. Arizona later received the name "Wildcats" after a Los Angeles Times correspondent, Bill Henry, wrote that "The Arizona men showed the fight of wildcats". Pop McKale was a very successful high school coach in the Tucson area when he was hired at UA. In 1921, Drop-kicker/receiver Harold "Nosey" McClellan led the nation in scoring with 124 points. Wildcats finished the regular season 7–1, and were invited to UA's first bowl game, the East-West Christmas Classic in San Diego, to play powerhouse Centre College of Kentucky; Arizona lost the game 38–0. The Wildcats did not compete in football in 1918 due to World War I. On October 18, 1926, UA quarterback and student body president John "Button" Salmon died from injuries sustained in a car wreck. His final words, spoken to coach "Pop" McKale, were: "Tell them.....tell the team to Bear Down." Soon thereafter, the UA student body adopted "Bear Down" as the school's athletic motto. On October 18, 1929, Arizona opened up Arizona Stadium for college football play. They won their first game against Caltech with a shutout score of 25–0. McKale retired after sixteen seasons at Arizona. The McKale Center, the University of Arizona's home basketball venue, was opened in 1973 and named in McKale's honor. vFred Enke replaced McKale as head coach of the Wildcats and in one season as head coach, he posted a record of 3–5–1 before getting demoted to assistant coach. Gus Farwick served as the head football coach at the University of Arizona in 1932, compiling a record of 4–5 before his resignation. Tex Oliver coached the Arizona Wildcats to a 32–11–4 record in five seasons. During that stretch, his teams never had a losing season. Oliver's "Blue Brigade" played an expanded, more nationwide schedule, and Arizona produced their first All-Americans under Oliver. The team's 1938 record of 8–2 was a school best to date. Oliver resigned after the 1937 season to accept the head football coach position at Oregon. Orian Landreth replaced Oliver and struggled in his one season as head coach, compiling a 3–6 record before he was fired. That season was the first losing season for the Wildcats in several years. Mike Casteel came to Arizona from his post as an assistant coach at Michigan State. In his eight seasons (Arizona did not field football teams in 1943 or 1944 due to World War II), Casteel compiled a 46–26–3 record and led the Wildcats to the first bowl berth in three decades in his final season, a loss in the 1949 Salad Bowl to Drake. Bob Winslow served as Arizona's head football coach for three seasons, posting a record of 12–18–1, with the team improving every year under his tutelage, going 2–7–1, 4–6 and 6–5 in Winslow's three years. Winslow resigned after three seasons.

In 1954, under coach Warren Woodson, who came to Arizona from Hardin–Simmons, the Wildcats were led by starting halfback Art Luppino. He went on to lead the nation in rushing, scoring, all-purpose running, and kickoff returns. Luppino became the first player in NCAA history to lead the nation in rushing twice. He also tied for the national title in all-purpose running and was third in scoring. Woodson was replaced after five seasons and a 26–22–2 record and was inducted into the College Football Hall of Fame as a coach in 1989. Ed Doherty came to Arizona from his post as an assistant coach for the NFL's Philadelphia Eagles. In two seasons, Doherty compiled a record of 4–15–1 before getting fired. Doherty is the only person to serve as head football coach at both Arizona and archrival Arizona State. Jim LaRue, formerly running backs coach at Houston, was hired to take over the program as head coach after Doherty's firing. LaRue's 1961 team finished 8–1–1 and finished the season ranked No. 17 in the final AP Poll. After that season, Arizona joined the Western Athletic Conference and LaRue's teams posted records of 5–5, 5–5, 6–3–1, 3–7 and 3–7 before LaRue was fired, largely because of the sub-par on-the-field performances but also pressure from fans and alumni.

Darrell Mudra came to Arizona from North Dakota State. His first team posted a record of 3–6–1 but in his second year, Mudra's Wildcats posted a record of 8–3, capped with a loss in the 1968 Sun Bowl, only the Wildcats third bowl appearance in school history and first since 1949. Mudra left Arizona after two seasons to accept the head football coach position at Western Illinois. His final record is 11–9–1. Mudra was inducted into the College Football Hall of Fame as a coach in 2000. Bob Weber was promoted from offensive coordinator to head coach following Mudra's departure. Under Weber, the Wildcats were 16–26, with their best season being a 5–6 1971 season. Weber failed to post a winning season as Arizona's head coach and was fired after four seasons.

Jim Young, formerly defensive coordinator at Michigan, was hired to turn around the downtrodden Wildcats football program. Improvement came immediately, as Young's team surprised the nation with an 8–3 record in his first season and shared the WAC title with rival Arizona State, but did not go to a bowl game due to them losing the tiebreaker to ASU (at the time, only the outright conference winner earned a bowl since there were fewer bowl games available, unless a team from the same conference appears in a major bowl). Young's Wildcats went on to post records of 9–2 in 1974 and 1975, the latter ending with a No. 13 and No. 18 ranking in the Coaches' and AP Polls, respectively (like in 1973, both seasons ended in no bowl appearances for the Wildcats due to them finishing second in the WAC). In a rebuilding year, Young's team posted a 5–6 record in 1976 to cap Young's mark of 31–13 in four seasons. Young departed Arizona after the 1976 season to accept the head football coach position at Purdue. He was inducted into the College Football Hall of Fame as a coach in 1999. Tony Mason came to Arizona from Cincinnati. Under Mason, the Wildcats went 5–7, 5–6 and 6–5–1 for a combined record of 16–18–1. In Mason's third and final season, the Wildcats played in the Fiesta Bowl, a game they lost. Mason was let go as head coach in early 1980 due to an alleged slush fund scandal involving him and the program during his tenure.

Larry Smith (1980–1986)

Larry Smith, previously head coach at Tulane, was hired to take over the Arizona football program to replace Mason. His first season was Arizona's third in the Pac-10 Conference. Smith put great emphasis on in-state recruiting, built up the rivalry game with ASU, and focused the team on what he called  "running and hitting".  His first team went 5–6, including a 44–7 blowout loss to ASU; it would be his only losing season at Arizona. The highlight of the season was a 23–17 upset of 2nd ranked UCLA (the Bruins were poised to become No. 1 as top ranked Alabama had lost earlier in the day).  The team improved to 6–5 during his second season, highlighted by a major 13–10 upset of No. 1 USC on the road.  Under his leadership, the Wildcats became competitive in the conference, began dominating the rivalry with the Sun Devils, and culminated with consecutive bowl appearances in the 1985 Sun Bowl, where a tie with Georgia gave the Wildcats an 8–3–1 record, and the 1986 Aloha Bowl, where a victory over North Carolina allowed the Wildcats to win their very first bowl game and to finish with a 9–3 record in his final season. Smith's tenure with the Wildcats ended with a 48–28–3 record.  Seven Arizona players earned All-America honors during his tenure, including two-time consensus All-American linebacker Ricky Hunley and All-Americans linebacker Lamonte Hunley (Ricky's younger brother), Morris Trophy-winning center Joe Tofflemire, safety Allan Durden, placekicker Max Zendejas (who is known for kicking game-winning field goals against Arizona State in 1983 and 1985), linebacker Byron Evans, and safety Chuck Cecil (who is known for returning an interception for a touchdown against ASU in 1986). Over twenty of Smith's Wildcats players went on to play professionally. Smith departed after the 1986 season to accept the head football coach position at conference foe USC. Smith died in 2008 and was voted as the second-best Wildcat football coach only behind his successor, Dick Tomey.

Dick Tomey (1987–2000)

In 1987, Tomey arrived in Arizona from Hawaii after ten seasons as the Rainbow Warriors head football coach to replace Smith. During his 14-season tenure with Arizona, he coached five future NFL first-round draft choices, 20 All-Americans, and 43 Pac-10 first team players.

His best teams were in the mid-1990s, highlighted by a tenacious defense nicknamed "Desert Swarm."  He led Arizona to the first two ten-win seasons in school history, highlighted by a 12–1 campaign in 1998, where the program finished fourth in both major polls, the highest ranking in school history.  Unfortunately, the Wildcats were drubbed in the 1999 season opener against Penn State and never recovered; Tomey resigned after the 2000 season.  His 95 wins are the most in Wildcats history.

In 1992, Coach Tomey's "Desert Swarm" defense was characterized by tough, hard-nosed tactics. UA led the nation in scoring defense and nose guard Rob Waldrop is a consensus All-American. The season included an upset victory over top-ranked Washington, which fans called the biggest Arizona win in the decade. In 1993, the team had its first 10-win season and won a share of the Pac-10 title. They would defeat Miami in the 1994 Fiesta Bowl by a score of 29–0. It was the bowl game's only shutout in its then 23-year history. The dominant defense, led by Waldrop and linebacker Tedy Bruschi, led the nation in total defense and rushing yards allowed. In 1994, Arizona was ranked No. 6. However, Arizona was upset by Colorado State and the rest of the season went down along with it. After mediocre seasons from 1995 to 1997, the 1998 team posted a school-record 12–1 season (see above) and made the Holiday Bowl in which the Wildcats defeated the Nebraska Cornhuskers. Arizona ended that season ranked fourth nationally in the coaches and Associated Press poll. The 1998 Holiday Bowl was televised on ESPN and set the now-surpassed record of being the most watched of any bowl game in that network's history. In 2000, Tomey's Wildcats suffered a season-ending 30–17 loss to Arizona State, the Wildcats' arch-rival. Tomey resigned under pressure after fourteen seasons as head coach of the Wildcats. The Wildcat football declined in wins and went on a bowl game drought over the next several years. Tomey was rated as the best Wildcat football coach in school history and he died in 2019, eleven years after his predecessor, Smith.

John Mackovic (2001–2003)
Former Illinois and Texas head coach John Mackovic was hired to replace Tomey. Mackovic was a college football analyst at ESPN at the time of his hiring.

Mackovic's tenure became a disaster, as he alienated his players and failed to post a winning record in two and one-half seasons in Tucson. Also, he finished with a 10–18 record (a .357 winning percentage) and never took his teams to bowl games. In his first season, the Wildcats narrowly missed a bowl game. Midway through the 2002 season, Mackovic told tight end Justin Levasseur that he was a disgrace to his family. Levasseur was arrested later that year with 87 pounds of marijuana This and other incidents led 40 players (including future Pro Bowler Lance Briggs) to hold a secret meeting with school president Peter Likins. The players complained about Mackovic's constant verbal abuse, such as an ugly tirade after a loss to Wisconsin. Mackovic offered a public apology to his players, the university and fans. However, whatever goodwill that he'd managed to restore quickly evaporated in 2003. Many players had lost their love for the game due to Mackovic's brusque manner and fans chanted “Fire Mackovic” during games. Five games into the season, Mackovic was fired and replaced on an interim basis by defensive coordinator Mike Hankwitz for the rest of the season. School officials said they had to act because it was obvious the Wildcats would not win with Mackovic at the helm. Mackovic was known as the worst Arizona coach in history (his predecessor, Tomey, was the best). Arizona also had poor recruiting in the Mackovic era that led to bad results, and the 2003 season was the worst in program history with a record of 2–10, with the ten losses being a school record.

Mike Stoops (2004–2011)
In 2004, Arizona hired Oklahoma defensive coordinator Mike Stoops, brother of famed Oklahoma head football coach Bob Stoops, to become the Wildcats’ 28th football coach. Stoops was hired to rebuild the team and to clean up the program's mess caused by Mackovic's troubles. Arizona began rebuilding and went 3–8 in Stoops’ first two seasons, which included upset victories over Arizona State in 2004 and UCLA in 2005. However, due to his record at the time, Stoops’ job was in critical danger and his margin for error was very thin. However, in his third season in 2006, Stoops led the Wildcats to an improved 6–6 record, the first non-losing season for the school since 1999 when the Wildcats went 6–6. The Wildcats upset California and became bowl-eligible. However, a loss to Arizona State and a losing conference record prevented them from earning a bowl bid.

After a mediocre 2007 season which included an upset over Oregon, the Wildcats improved in 2008 and earned their first bowl berth in a decade, defeating BYU by a score of 31–21. In 2009, the Wildcats earned their second straight bowl berth and a second straight eight-win season. Arizona was defeated 33–0 by Nebraska in a rematch of the 1998 Holiday Bowl. Following the Holiday Bowl, offensive coordinator Sonny Dykes left the Wildcat program to become the head coach at Louisiana Tech, and defensive coordinator Mark Stoops, a brother of both Mike and Bob, became the defensive coordinator at Florida State and later became a future head coach at Kentucky. To replace them, Mike Stoops promoted Bill Bedenbaugh and Seth Littrell to co-offensive coordinators, while promoting Tim Kish to be co-defensive coordinators with Greg Brown, who was hired from Colorado.

The Wildcats began the 2010 season with high expectations and became possible contenders for a Rose Bowl berth. However, they collapsed late in the season and lost to Oklahoma State in the Alamo Bowl by a score of 37–10. In 2011, the Wildcats began the season hoping to rebound and Stoops being placed on the hot seat. After starting the season with a win against Northern Arizona), Arizona would lose four in a row and fans became incensed by the team's performance and began calling for Stoops’ firing. After another loss in early October, Stoops was fired as coach. Including the prior season, the Wildcats under Stoops had lost 10 consecutive games against FBS opponents, with their last victory over a FBS team taking place nearly a year earlier on October 30, 2010, against UCLA. Arizona said that Stoops’ firing was a result of “the inability to win more games, weak recruiting, and being unable to achieve the team’s goal to make a Rose Bowl appearance”, as well as Stoops’ frequently misbehavior towards officials on the sidelines (which was often seen on TV broadcasts of Arizona games). Tim Kish, the team's defensive coordinator, was named interim head coach for the remainder of the season. (Stoops returned to the Sooner program soon thereafter as defensive coordinator; Kish, who had known the Stoops brothers for many years, followed Stoops and joined the Sooner staff as the linebackers coach.) Under Kish, the Wildcats partially rebounded and won three of the final six games to finish with a 4–8 record. The later years of the Stoops era featured quarterback Nick Foles breaking Arizona records, including the single-season and career records for most passing yards and touchdowns. Foles would win a future Super Bowl in 2017 for the Philadelphia Eagles.

Rich Rodriguez (2012–2017)

On November 21, 2011, Arizona announced the hiring of Rich Rodriguez, at that time a CBS Sports college football analyst and formerly the head coach at Michigan and West Virginia, to become Arizona's 30th head football coach. Rodriguez is considered a pioneer of a no huddle, run-oriented version of the spread offense, although a pass-first version was already being implemented by others.

Rodriguez' hiring ended a 41-day search for a head coach which started following Mike Stoops' dismissal after eight seasons as Wildcat head coach. Following West Virginia's victory in the Orange Bowl in 2011, the Mountaineers defensive coordinator Jeff Casteel, who coached under Rodriguez during his tenure there, departed WVU's staff to join Rodriguez' staff as the Wildcats' defensive coordinator. An official announcement, and Casteel's formal introduction to the Tucson media, was made on January 13, 2012. Casteel is considered one of the top defensive coaches in the nation, and considered master of the 3–3–5 "odd stack" defense. In his first season, Rodriguez took the Wildcats to the New Mexico Bowl, where they defeated Nevada in a comeback victory. The Wildcats finished the 2012 campaign with a (8–5, 4–5 Pac-12) record, which included an upset win over USC.

In his second season, Rodriguez took the Wildcats to the Independence Bowl, where they defeated Boston College. The Wildcats finished the 2013 campaign with a (8–5, 4–5 Pac-12) record. Major highlights of the season included a big upset victory over Oregon and the performance of running back Ka’Deem Carey, who set Arizona records for rushing yards and touchdowns scored. In 2014, Rich Rodriguez led the Wildcats to a 10–3 regular season, behind generally solid team performance, including efforts from freshman QB Anu Solomon, sophomore LB Scooby Wright III (who earned Pac-12 Defensive Player of the Year among other honors), senior RB Terris Jones-Grigsby, and freshman RB Nick Wilson. The Wildcats won the Pac-12 South Division, the first divisional championship in program history, advancing to the conference title game at Levi's Stadium in Santa Clara, California, where they were dominated by Oregon, 51–13, and led Oregon to clinching a spot in the inaugural College Football Playoff. The Wildcats earned a berth in the Fiesta Bowl, the school's third major-bowl appearance, where they faced the Boise State Broncos, and lost 38–30. The Wildcats finished the 2014 season with a record of 10–4 (7–2 Pac-12), achieving only the third 10-win season in program history and their first since 1998. They also finished the season ranked No. 17 in the USA Today Coaches Poll and No. 19 in the AP Poll. Highlights of the regular season included a comeback win over California on a Hail Mary touchdown pass, upsetting Oregon for the second year in a row, defeating Washington on a last-second field goal, and outlasting Arizona State for the division championship (Oregon would get revenge on the Wildcats in the Pac-12 title game, leading Arizona to the Fiesta Bowl).

In 2015, Rodriguez's Wildcats finished with a record of 7–6 (3–6 in Pac-12). The Wildcats upset Utah in the regular season and defeated old rival New Mexico in the New Mexico Bowl by a score of 45–37. In 2016, the Wildcats finished with a record of 3–9 (1–8 in Pac-12), thus ineligible for a bowl game. Injuries and a poor defense affected the team's chances of winning and had lost eight consecutive games before defeating rival Arizona State in the season finale. In 2017, they lost to Purdue in the Foster Farms Bowl, the Wildcats 21st bowl game. The Wildcats finished with a record of 7–6 (5–4 Pac-12). During the season, the performance of sophomore QB Khalil Tate was especially impressive; after an injury to starter Brandon Dawkins in the October 7 road game at Colorado, Tate took over and proceeded to run for 327 yards, a single-game FBS record for quarterbacks, breaking the previous record of Northern Illinois' Jordan Lynch set in 2013. Tate was awarded the Pac-12 Offensive player of the week and would be named the starting quarterback. Tate then led the Wildcats to consecutive victories over UCLA, Cal, and Washington State. Tate was named Pac-12 Offensive player of the week for four consecutive weeks – setting a conference record, and leading to his briefly being spoken of as a candidate for the Heisman Trophy.

Rodriguez was dismissed as head coach on January 2, 2018, in the wake of an internal university investigation of sexual harassment claims made by Rodriguez' former administrative assistant. Other factors in Rodriguez being fired was the lack of winning enough games that mattered as well as not bringing in elite recruiting classes to the program. Arizona was forced to find a new coach to rebuild the program.

Kevin Sumlin (2018–2020)
Kevin Sumlin was hired on January 14, 2018, as the Wildcats’ 31st head football coach. Sumlin was previously head coach at Texas A&M University and the University of Houston. Sumlin became the first African-American coach to lead the Wildcat football program.

In his first season, Sumlin instituted a new offense and the Wildcats struggled to a 5–7 (4–5 in Pac-12) record. In 2019, with returning QB Khalil Tate, Arizona went 4–1 early in the season but finished the season with a 4–8 record (2–7 in Pac-12) record including another rivalry loss to Arizona State. In 2020, the Wildcats played a truncated season with a conference-only schedule due to the COVID-19 pandemic. The season followed an offseason of poor recruiting and players taking COVID-19 opt-outs and Sumlin being placed on the hot seat. Arizona continued to struggle on the field under Sumlin's watch and was embarrassed by rival Arizona State. Sumlin was fired after the season concluded and finished with a 0–3 record against ASU. The sportswriters of the campus newspaper, the Arizona Daily Wildcat, expressed disapproval with Sumlin's leadership, the lack of production on defense, lack of quarterback protection, a toxic atmosphere in the locker room, players losing their enthusiasm, failure to bring in top-caliber recruits and an overall decline in the reputation of the Wildcat program; it was also implied that connections to the Tucson community, and local and regional high school football coaches, suffered under Sumlin's tenure. Wildcat defensive coordinator Paul Rhoads (a former head coach at Iowa State) served as the team's interim head coach; Rhoads joined the staff of the Ohio State football program in February.

Jedd Fisch (2021–present)
Soon after Sumlin was fired at the conclusion of the 2020 season, Arizona conducted a national coaching search. Former college and NFL coach Jedd Fisch (most recently the QB coach for the New England Patriots) was chosen as the Wildcats’ 32nd head football coach, as announced on December 23, 2020. Fisch and San Jose State coach Brent Brennan (a former assistant under Wildcat coach Dick Tomey in his final year in Tucson, as well for a few seasons at San Jose State) were the two finalists for the opening. Fisch has previous ties to University of Arizona president Dr. Robert Robbins. Fisch has extensive NFL assistant coaching experience (for five different franchises) and previously was a collegiate assistant at UCLA, Michigan, Minnesota and Miami. In Fisch's first season, the Wildcats earned a 1–11 record (1–8 in Pac-12 play), with their lone win (ending a 20-game losing streak) coming at home against California on November 6 (several players and coaches on the Golden Bears were out because of COVID-19).

Conference affiliations
 Independent (1899–1930)
 Border Conference (1931–1961)
 WAC (1962–1977)
 Pac-12 Conference (1978–present)
 Pacific-10 Conference (1978–2010)
 Pac-12 Conference (2011–present)

Head coaches
 
The following are the head coaches of the Arizona Wildcats.

Coaching staff

Championships

Conference championships 
Arizona has claimed at least a share of six conference titles.

 Co-champions

Division championships 
The Wildcats claimed the South Division title of the Pac-12 in 2014.

Bowl games

Arizona has appeared in 21 bowl games, posting an overall record of 9–11-1. The team's most recent appearance in a bowl game was a 45–37 win against New Mexico at the 2015 New Mexico Bowl.

The team's first bowl game was the 1968 Sun Bowl, under coach Darrell Mudra. The Wildcats lost to the Auburn Tigers 34–10 in that contest. The team's next bowl game came in 1993 when Arizona began a streak of 5 straight bowl appearances under coach Dick Tomey that lasted through the 1998 season. This is the 5th-longest bowl streak in college football history.

Arizona has been invited six times to one of the "New Year's Six" major bowl games (the Rose, Sugar, Fiesta, Orange, Cotton, and Peach Bowls), including two appearances in CFP in 2014 and Bowl Coalition game in 1993.

All-time series records 
Arizona's season records are from the record books of the university's athletic association.  Through the end of the 2021 season, Arizona has compiled an overall record of 618 wins, 459 losses, and 33 ties (including post-season bowl games).

All-time record against current Pac-12 teams 

Arizona plays Pac-12 North opponents California, Oregon, Oregon State, Stanford, Washington, and Washington State along with Pac-12 South foe Arizona State on an annual basis. The other Pac-12 North teams are played on a six-year rotation, with the added possibility of meeting in the PAC-12 Championship Game.

All-time record against in-state opponents 
The University of Arizona's athletic program operated with a limited budget for the first several years after its establishment in 1899. To reduce travel costs, early Arizona football teams played limited slates of games, mostly against squads from nearby schools. Local scheduling resulted in the development of gridiron rivalries with several in-state private colleges, most notably Arizona State and Northern Arizona.

All records accurate as of the conclusion of the 2023 season

College Football Playoff rankings and polls

College Football Playoff rankings 

Preseason polls 

Final polls

Rivalries

Arizona State

The primary rival of the Wildcats is Arizona State. Both teams are members of the South Division of the Pac-12. The annual matchup the two schools is known as the "Duel in the Desert." The winner receives the Territorial Cup trophy. Originating in 1899, the Wildcats lost the first game by a score of 11–2. Arizona leads the series at 50–45–1 through the end of the 2021 season.

New Mexico

A major rival of the Wildcats in the 1900s was against the New Mexico Lobos. The series was intense until the annual matchup was canceled after the 1990 season. Both teams have met twice in bowl games, with Arizona winning both, as they won the 1997 Insight.com Bowl and the 2015 New Mexico Bowl. Arizona leads the head-to-head series at 44–20–3 with the most recent game played in 2015.

Home Stadium and facilities

Arizona Stadium

Arizona plays its home games at Arizona Stadium, located on the campus in Tucson, Arizona. The stadium capacity is 50,800 as of 2022.

Lowell-Stevens Football Facility
The 187,000 square foot facility houses the football programs weight room, locker room, medical treatment room, players lounge, cafeteria, coaches' offices, auditorium for team meetings, as well as a media room.
The facility also offers 4,200 chair seating, as well as 500 premium seating.

Traditions

Logos and uniforms

Starting in the 2010 season, Arizona wore new uniforms. They are simplified versions of the uniforms worn from 2005 to 2009, with the addition of a white helmet with a red-white-blue stripe. The team may use any combination of its two helmets, three jerseys and three pants. On September 29, 2012, the Wildcats unveiled a new copper helmet and for the Territorial Cup game later that season, they unveiled an all-red helmet.

On September 20, 2015, the Wildcats unveiled a new "chrome red" helmet which they wore on September 26, 2015, against the UCLA Bruins.

On August 4, 2021, Arizona announced it would be going back to an updated version of their "Desert Swarm" uniforms worn during the Dick Tomey era.

Individual accomplishments

National winners

University honors
Retired Jersey NumbersUniversity Honors (Student-Athlete jerseys are retired but not individual player numbers.)
Darryll Lewis, CB, 1987–90
Antoine Cason, CB, 2004–07
Chuck Cecil, S, 1985–87
Chris McAlister, CB, 1996–98
Art Luppino,RB, 1953–56
Steve McLaughlin, K,1991–95
Tedy Bruschi, LB, 1991–95
Ricky Hunley, LB, 1980–83
Rob Waldrop, DT, 1990–93Defensive honorsLombardi AwardBest defensive player 
Scooby Wright III – 2014Nagurski TrophyTop defensive playerScooby Wright  – 2014 Outland TrophyTop interior lineman 
Rob Waldrop – 1993Jack Lambert TrophyTop linebackerScooby Wright – 2014Jim Thorpe AwardTop defensive back 
Darryll Lewis – 1990
Antoine Cason – 2007Special teams''Lou Groza Award  Best kickerSteve McLaughlin – 1994Mosi Tatupu Award 
 Chris McAlister – 1998

Conference awards
 Pac-12 Offensive Player of the Year Ka'Deem Carey – 2013Pac-12 Offensive Freshman of the Year Mike Thomas – 2005
 J. J. Taylor – 2017Pac-12 Defensive Player of the Year Ricky Hunley – 1983
 Byron Evans – 1986
 Chuck Cecil – 1987
 Dana Wells – 1988
 Darryll Lewis – 1990
 Rob Waldrop – 1993
 Tedy Bruschi – 1995
 Scooby Wright – 2014Pac-12 Defensive Freshman of the Year Colin Schooler – 2017Pac-12 Coach of theYear Dick Tomey – 1992
 Rich Rodriguez – 2014Morris Trophy 
 Dana Wells – 1987, 1988 (Defense)
 Joe Tofflemire – 1988 (Offense)
 Rob Waldrop – 1992 (Defense)
 Tedy Bruschi – 1995 (Defense)
 Yusuf Scott – 1998 (Offense)

Heisman voting
Arizona has had two players finish in the top 10 of the Heisman Trophy voting as of 2017.

All-Americans

Hall of Fame inductees

Canadian Football Hall of Fame

There are two former Wildcat players inducted into the Canadian Football Hall of Fame.

College Football Hall of Fame

Arizona has four former players and three former coaches who have been inducted into the College Football Hall of Fame as of 2017.

Future opponents

 Annual Pac-12 South opponents 
Arizona has played each of the other members of the Pac-12 Division every year since the Pac-12 expanded to an eight-game league schedule in 2011. Arizona's annual conference opponents are Arizona State, Colorado, USC, UCLA and Utah, usually scheduled in that order. The Territorial Cup is played annually in Tucson and Tempe.

 Pac-12 North opponents 
In addition to six games against Northern division opponents, Arizona plays two games against Northern division opponents. The other six Pac-12 North Division teams rotate on a six-year cycle, with the Arizona playing every Southern division team once every six years (twice every 12 years) with alternating home and away games.

The winners of the North and South divisions meet in the Pac-12 Championship Game, potentially creating a rematch of a regular season contest. Arizona has played in 1st Pac-12 Championship Game in 2014, when they won over Oregon in the regular season and lost again in the Pac-12 championship.

Non-conference opponents
Announced non-conference schedules as of October 12, 2021.

 Neutral site game P5 School is an opponent from a Power 5 Conference.FBS Ind. School is a Division I FBS independent schoolG5 School is an opponent from a Group of Five ConferenceFCS School is an opponent from the Football Championship Subdivision

Recruiting 

Since 2002, Arizona has been ranked in the Top 25 in recruiting ranking by multiple ranking services.

Media  
 Radio flagship: KCUB (AM) - 1290 AM in Tucson, Arizona
 Spanish-language radio flagship: KTKT (990 AM) – branded La Buena 94.3  1020-AM in Tucson, AZ
 Broadcasters: Brian Jeffries (play-by-play) and Lamont Lovett (color analyst) 
 Spanish-language broadcasters: Francisco Romero (play-by-play) and Luis Hernandez (analyst)
 Past broadcasters: 

The current flagship radio station for Wildcat football and men's basketball is Tucson sports radio station KCUB, branded as “Wildcats Radio 1290”. From 1983 until 2004, the flagship station was news/talk radio station KNST. The primary play-by-play voice of Wildcat football, baseball and men's basketball, since 1987, is Brian Jeffries (after starting out as the color commentator for former CBS Sports announcer Ray Scott, who called Wildcats games from 1984 through the spring of 1987). The Phoenix radio affiliate for Arizona Wildcats football and men's basketball is KGME, branded as "Fox Sports 910."

 Public address announcer:''' Jeff Dean
Previously: Jimmy Zasa

See also

 Arizona Wildcats
 University of Arizona traditions
 List of Arizona Wildcats home football stadiums
 List of Border Intercollegiate Athletic Association football champions
 List of Western Athletic Conference football champions
 List of Pac-12 Conference football champions
 List of NCAA Division I FBS football programs

References

External links

 

 
American football teams established in 1899
1899 establishments in Arizona Territory